Anochetus boltoni is a species of ant in the genus Anochetus. It was discovered in 2003 by B. L. Fisher in Madagascar and described by Fisher, B. L. & Smith, M. A. in 2008.

References

External links

Ponerinae
Insects described in 2008